Northern Story is a 1960 Soviet drama film directed by Yevgeni Andrikanis.

Plot 
The film takes place on the eve of the Decembrist revolt in 1825. The film tells about officer Pavel Bestuzhev, who is sent into exile in the garrison in the North. There he meets the wounded Decembrist, who is trying to leave Russia. Pavel decides to help him.

Cast 
 Oleg Strizhenov as Pavel Bestuzhev
 Eva Murniece as Anna Jakobsen / Maria Jakobsen
 Valentin Zubkov as Tikhonov
 Gennadi Yudin as Shchedrin
 Nikolai Svobodin as Kiselyov
 Viktor Kulakov as Merk
 Georgi Chernovolenko as father of Anna
 Aleksandr Kutepov as Lobov

References

External links 
 

1960 films
1960s Russian-language films
Soviet drama films
1960 drama films